Edwin Clifford Webb (1921–2006) was a biochemist.  He studied nerve gases at the University of Cambridge where he was a Beit Fellow and lecturer.  He had earned his doctorate there, working in the laboratory of Malcolm Dixon and continued to collaborate with him in the study of enzymes.  Together, they wrote a classic textbook on the subject, Enzymes, which was first published by Longmans in 1958,  He then took a chair in biochemistry at the University of Queensland but continued to collaborate with Dixon on further editions.  In 1970, he became the Deputy Vice-Chancellor at Queensland and in 1975 he became the second Vice-Chancellor of Macquarie University.  He retired in 1986 but continued to work on the enzyme list of the International Union of Biochemistry and Molecular Biology (IUBMB) while living in Townsville.

Research

Cambridge
Webb's first paper was written with Kenneth Bailey on yeast pyrophosphatase, the first of many papers on enzymes. It was followed by several papers on nerve gases, for example on British anti-lewisite with Ruth van Heyningen. Research collaboration with Malcolm Dixon began with a study of phosphotransferases, and continued with other work, both theoretical and experimental.

Queensland
After moving to Queensland Webb collaborated with Burt Zerner on Jack bean urease, starting with a study of its purification and assay, followed by other papers on the same enzyme. He also worked with Zerner on other enzymes, including carboxylesterases.

Nomenclature
Webb's interest in biochemical nomenclature started early in his career, and after the IUBMB compilation was published for the last time as a printed book he wrote a retrospective article about it.

References

1921 births
2006 deaths
Academics of the University of Cambridge
Alumni of Clare College, Cambridge
Biochemists
Academic staff of Macquarie University
People from Dorset
Academic staff of the University of Queensland